The 1926 Beloit Buccaneers football team represented Beloit College during the 1926 college football season.  In Roy Bohler's first year with the Buccaneers, Beloit compiled a 0–7 record, and was outscored by their opponents by a total of 238 to 13, a complete turnaround after last season's 6–2 MCAC co-championship record.

Schedule

References

Beloit
Beloit Buccaneers football seasons
College football winless seasons
Beloit Buccaneers football